Stolen Life (original title: Voleur de vie) is a 1998 French drama film directed and co-written by Yves Angelo and starring Emmanuelle Béart and Sandrine Bonnaire. It is based on a novel by Icelandic author Steinunn Sigurðardóttir.

Cast 
 Emmanuelle Béart as Alda
 Sandrine Bonnaire as Olga
 André Dussollier as Jakob
 Vahina Giocante as Sigga
 Éric Ruf as Yann
 André Marcon as Steindor
 Bulle Ogier as The woman in cemetery
 François Chattot as The father
 Rudi Rosenberg as Peter
 Nathalie Richard as Yann's wife

References

External links 
 

1998 films
1998 drama films
1990s French-language films
French drama films
Films directed by Yves Angelo
Films based on Icelandic novels
1990s French films